Vier Jongens en een Jeep  is a 1955 Dutch film directed by Ernst Winar.

Cast
Karel Gortmaker		
Jan Kreuger	
Sylvain Poons	… 	Canadian uncle John
Nico van der Put		
Dick Visser		
Ernst Winar

External links 
 

1955 films
Dutch black-and-white films
Dutch adventure films
1955 adventure films